The Best American Poetry 1988, the first volume in The Best American Poetry series, was edited by David Lehman and by guest editor John Ashbery, who chose one of his own poems among the group of 75.

Lehman's forward
Although Lehman would later use his forewords as a kind of "state of poetry" review of the previous year, in this first volume he concentrated on the nature of this anthology, with most of the foreword given over to explaining the mechanics of the process (see The Best American Poetry series for those comments).

There seem to be plenty of creative writing programs, so it appears there will be an audience for the series, Lehman wrote, and with poetry appearing in so many different publications, an annual anthology could help readers find poetry in one place.

Poets and poems included

See also
 1988 in poetry

External links
 Web page for contents of the book, with links to each publication where the poems originally appeared

Best American Poetry series
1988 poetry books
American poetry anthologies